Zindagi Na Milegi Dobara, also abbreviated as ZNMD, is a 2011 Indian Hindi-language buddy road comedy drama film directed by Zoya Akhtar and produced by Farhan Akhtar and Ritesh Sidhwani under Excel Entertainment. The film stars an ensemble cast of Hrithik Roshan, Abhay Deol, Farhan Akhtar, Katrina Kaif and Kalki Koechlin. The music and background score are composed by Shankar–Ehsaan–Loy with lyrics by Javed Akhtar.

The film's story follows three childhood friends, Arjun, Kabir, and Imran, who reunite for a three-week road trip. They set off to Spain and meet Laila, who falls in love with Arjun and helps him overcome his compulsion to work. Kabir and his fiancée Natasha experience significant misunderstandings, while Imran wishes to meet his biological father, an artist. During their trip, each friend chooses a dangerous sport for the group to partake in.

Zindagi Na Milegi Dobara was initially planned to release on 27 May 2011, but technical problems with post-production work led to the release being postponed to 24 June, and again to 15 July that year. The film had a worldwide release on 1,800 screens and was a commercial success grossing  and received widespread critical acclaim for its direction, story, screenplay, music, humor, cinematography and performances of the ensemble cast. 

At the 57th Filmfare Awards, Zindagi Na Milegi Dobara received a leading 13 nominations, including Best Actor (Hrithik Roshan), Best Supporting Actor (Abhay Deol) and Best Supporting Actress (Kalki Koechlin), and won a leading 7 awards, including Best Film, Best Film (Critics), Best Director (Zoya Akhtar) and Best Supporting Actor (Farhan Akhtar). Additionally, at the 59th National Film Awards, it won 2 awards – Best Choreography (Bosco-Caesar for "Senorita") and Best Audiography (Baylon Fonseca). The film is now available on Netflix and Amazon Prime Video.

Plot 
Kabir Dewan is planning a three-week road-trip bachelor party in Spain with his friends from school – Imran Qureshi, an advertising copywriter; and Arjun Saluja, a financial broker based in London. Kabir says the three friends have a long-standing pact, and that during the road trip each of them will pick a surprise adventure sport in which they all have to participate together. Arjun is initially reluctant to take the trip as he does not want to miss work. Imran secretly plans to find his estranged biological father after discovering letters from his late foster father Faisal Qureshi, though his mother Rahila resists the thought.

The three men fly to Spain separately and meet in Barcelona, where Imran takes Kabir out to find an art gallery where they come across the work of Salman Habib, an artist who lives in Spain. They plan to visit Costa Brava, Seville, and Pamplona. On the way to Costa Brava, Imran and Kabir are annoyed when Arjun continues working on the journey. While Arjun is driving, Imran casually throws Arjun's mobile phone out of their car, which results in a physical altercation. Arjun, in a fit of rage, accuses Imran of being unapologetic for being involved four years prior with Arjun's then-girlfriend Sonali; Kabir stops the argument. Upon reaching their destination, they meet Laila, an Anglo-Indian woman, to whom Arjun is immediately attracted; Imran flirts with her and makes Arjun jealous.

Kabir announces he has chosen underwater diving as their first sport, and they later find that Laila is their diving instructor. Arjun, who cannot swim and is aquaphobic, receives assistance from Laila to overcome his fears, and finishes the sport successfully, gaining a new perspective of life. Laila suggests they attend the La Tomatina festival with her in Buñol, interfering with Arjun's planned activity; Arjun accepts and they head to the festival. Meanwhile, Natasha Arora, Kabir's fiancée, becomes suspicious that Kabir is involved with Laila when she sees her on a video call with Kabir; he tries to explain that Laila has been invited over to the boys' villa for dinner, but Natasha does not believe him. Natasha crashes the bachelor party trip, much to Kabir's discomfort. Imran spends time with Laila's friend Nuria, and Arjun with Laila. After the men leave for Seville, both Arjun and Laila realise they have fallen in love and not to regret the partition, Laila chases them on a bike, kissing Arjun passionately before saying goodbye. Arjun now feels significantly more at peace with himself, and Natasha is relieved of her suspicions about Kabir.

On their way to Seville, Kabir drops Natasha at the airport, while Arjun and Imran discuss Kabir's change in behaviour around Natasha. The trio then visits Seville to go skydiving, Arjun's choice of sport. During the task, Imran is forced to confront his acrophobia and hesitates to take part, but does so anyway. After skydiving, the three men go to a bar and get drunk. After a prank backfires, they are arrested and held in custody until Imran reveals to his friends that Salman is his father. Imran calls Salman, who bails them out and takes them to his home. During a conversation with Imran, Salman reveals that he never wanted the responsibility of married life or children but Rahila did; as they continue talking, Imran notices that Salman still does not feel sorry for leaving Rahila. Realizing how his actions must have hurt Arjun four years ago, he apologises to him, and Arjun, appreciating the genuineness of his apology, forgives him with a hug.

The three men learn of the running of the bulls in Pamplona, which is Imran's choice, baffling Kabir and Arjun. Imran contacts Laila, who joins them. When confronted by his friends, Kabir reveals to the others that he proposed to Natasha by accident; he had bought a ring as a birthday present for his mother, and while showing it to Natasha, she had mistaken it for an engagement ring. Arjun realises why the trip was so important to Kabir; nobody apart from his two best friends would tell him to cancel his wedding. On the morning of the bull run, Imran suggests they make another pact for if they survive the event: Imran vows to publish the poetry he has written in his diary, Arjun vows to go to Morocco with Laila and live to the fullest, and Kabir promises to tell Natasha he does not want to marry her yet. The three friends complete the event successfully, gaining a renewed sense of life.

Imran, Kabir, Nuria, and Natasha later attend Arjun and Laila's wedding. Natasha and Kabir are no longer together but are still friends, and Natasha introduces him to her new partner. Imran's poems are revealed to have been published.

Cast 
 Hrithik Roshan as Arjun Saluja
 Abhay Deol as Kabir Dewan
 Farhan Akhtar as Imran Qureshi
 Katrina Kaif as Laila
 Kalki Koechlin as Natasha Arora
 Ariadna Cabrol as Nuria
 Naseeruddin Shah as Salman Habib(Cameo)
 Deepti Naval as Rahila Qureshi
 Suhel Seth as Mr. Arora
 Concha Montero as Senorita

Anupam Kher filmed scenes as Imran's stepfather Faisal Qureshi, but they did not make the theatrical cut.

Production

Development 

In November 2009, director-writer Zoya Akhtar and Reema Kagti completed the scripting of a film after three months of work. The script had the working title Running with the Bulls, before the title Zindagi Na Milegi Dobara was finalised, the new title being an amendment of the line "Zindagi Milegi Na Dobara" from the title song of Rock On!! (2008). Akhtar and Kagti incorporated real-life observations and wrote the character of Imran for the former's brother Farhan, who wrote the dialogue for the film. Farhan produced the film with Ritesh Sidhwani under Excel Entertainment. The theme of the film was "three guys on the verge of making commitments in life", according to him. They used Farhan's father Javed Akhtar's poetry as a voiceover because they felt the poetry added depth to the characters and lent voice to their feelings. A special poem inspired by a fan's poem was written for Katrina Kaif's character after she was cast in the project. The first choice for the location of principal photography was Mexico, but was later changed to Spain because the climax features the running of bulls and Zoya wanted a country that blended history, culture, and sports. The film's release date was postponed twice because its original editor Chandan Arora fell ill and they had to re-edit it.

Casting 
Initially, the producers wanted Ranbir Kapoor and Imran Khan to play two of the three leads, but they declined without specifying a reason. Farhan Akhtar had worked with Zoya on her debut film Luck by Chance (2009) and also wrote dialogue for the film; Zoya felt he would know exactly what she wanted from the film. He was the first actor to be cast in the film. Farhan Akhtar defined his role as a "fun character" and a "guy who for the longest time takes nothing seriously". Hrithik Roshan was chosen for another lead role because he was one of Zoya's favourite actors. After finalising the two, she needed someone "who could not just fit in with them visually but also bring something new to the table." She sought Abhay Deol for the role, as he was her friend and had worked with her before in Kagti's Honeymoon Travels Pvt. Ltd. (2007)

For the role of Laila, Zoya wanted someone with an accent who would be willing to scuba dive, and was a half-Indian and half-Caucasian woman. A lot of women were auditioned for the part in New York and London. Later, at a party, Zoya met Katrina Kaif and chose her for the role. Her role was described as "a free- spirited girl, a wanderer at heart and a bohemian gypsy by nature". Zoya had wanted to work with Kalki Koechlin ever since seeing her in Dev.D (2009) and That Girl in Yellow Boots (2011); she felt Koechlin would suit the character of Natasha because she had "the sense of comedy, but not over-the-top". Spanish actress Ariadna Cabrol was chosen for the role of Nuria because Zoya liked her work in the 2009 Spanish film Eloïse's Lover.

Filming 
Principal photography began in June 2010 and took place in the United Kingdom, Egypt, Mumbai, and in Spain at Barcelona, Pamplona, Buñol and Andalusia. Cinematographer Carlos Catalan, who had worked with Zoya on Luck by Chance, wanted all three lead actors to appear tanned because he "didn't want everything glossed over" and wanted to make the film as realistic as possible.

Kaif's introduction scene was shot on a nudist beach; during the filming, the crew asked beach-goers stay out of the frame to avoid objections from the Central Board of Film Certification. The La Tomatina festival of Buñol was re-created for the song "Ik Junoon"; almost sixteen tons of tomatoes worth  were flown in from Portugal for the scene. A scene involving a kiss between Roshan and Kaif was filmed despite the couple's reluctance to do so. The filming of the flamenco song "Señorita" took place in Alájar, a town in the province of Huelva. The crew warned local residents about the song's volume because the scene was filmed at night. On the third day of filming, locals dressed in costumes attended and the mayor of Alájar joined them. The climax of the film, which features the running of the bulls, was filmed at Pamplona. The final schedules were at Vashi and Alibag in Mumbai in December 2010.

Soundtrack 

Composer trio Shankar–Ehsaan–Loy, who had worked with Farhan Akhtar in Rock On!! (2008) and Karthik Calling Karthik (2010), composed the soundtrack for the film. The lyrics were written by Javed Akhtar. The composers engaged María del Mar Fernández, a Spanish flamenco singer, to perform the vocals on "Señorita"; her film-singing debut. The song is also the singing debut of Roshan and Deol, who sang it along with Farhan Akhtar.

Marketing 

The trailer of the film was revealed with the prints of Ready which released on 3 June 2011, and was released online on 15 May 2011. Excel Entertainment partnered with Aircel to make promotional videos for the film available on mobile phones and the Internet. The trailer was watched over 55 million times within 48 hours of its release. Two more videos—one each for the songs "Ik Junoon" and "Senorita"—were released on 27 May. The music launch and promotion event took place at Nirmal Lifestyle, Mulund, Mumbai. A press conference promoting the film was held on 1 July at Chandigarh. Two dialogue promos of the film were released on 3 July. On 7 July the cast and crew embarked on a road trip from Mumbai to Delhi via Surat, Vadodra, Ahmedabad, Udaipur, Ajmer and Jaipur that culminated in a concert at Gurgaon. It is believed that British Auto manufacturer Land Rover—which is now owned by Tata Motors—sponsored the Land Rover Discovery driven by the cast members during the trip. A premier at the 12th IIFA Awards before the worldwide release was planned but was not executed.

The film's marketers released branded promotional items with Mountain Dew, Gillette and ING Vysya Bank. A mobile video game based on Zindagi Na Milegi Dobara and the La Tomatina festival was released by Jump Games on 19 July 2011 for popular mobile operating systems. OPIUM Eyewear launched exclusive Zindagi Na Milegi Dobara sunglasses to promote the film.

Release 

The release of Zindagi Na Milegi Dobara was initially scheduled for 27 May 2011, but was postponed to 24 June 2011 and again to 15 July 2011. It was released in 1,800 screens worldwide. A special screening of the film was held at the residence of Shah Rukh Khan on 16 July, on the occasion of Kaif's birthday. The event was attended by several celebrities, including the film's cast and crew. The far-right political party Shiv Sena criticised the event because it was held three days after the 2011 Mumbai bombings. The producers of the film donated the collections of the film from around 10 theatres in Mumbai to the Maharashtra government as a mark of charity to the victims of the bombings. On 24 March 2012, ZNMD was screened at Bucks New University in High Wycombe, England.

The film was released on DVD on 30 August 2011. It is available in Dolby Digital 5.1 and stereo formats with English and Arabic subtitles. The film is also available on Blu-ray disc. Later on, the film was made available in both Netflix and Amazon Prime Video.

Critical reception 

Zindagi Na Milegi Dobara garnered widespread acclaim from critics who praised its direction, story, screenplay, music, humor, cinematography and performances of the ensemble cast. 

Pratim D. Gupta of The Telegraph called Zindagi Na Milegi Dobara "a beautifully scripted journey of catharsis" and praised director Zoya Akhtar for being "fearless in the way she shoots". In his review for Hindustan Times, Mayank Shekhar gave the film four stars praised the film as "a game-changer for Hindi films since Dil Chahta Hai (2001), and wrote, "What you take home are memorable, amusing moments of three truly adventurous amigos we've all grown up with. And will continue to." Shivesh Kumar of IndiaWeekly awarded the film 4 stars. Taran Adarsh of Bollywood Hungama gave the film 3.5/5, calling it a film for "a more evolved, mature and cinema-literate audience that's geared up to embrace and support newer genres of cinema". Nikhat Kazmi of The Times of India gave the film 3.5/5 stars and lauded its lead performances; "If Abhay is the anchor of the group, Farhan's funster role is full of beans and Hrithik's metamorphosis from uptight, money-minded stock broker to carefree vagabond is a class act".

S. Chatterjee of NDTV, gave the film 3/5 stars and said its philosophy is quite old; he praised Zoya Akhtar's direction, stating, "Zoya Akhtar, by investing the tale with a delightful lightness of touch and dollops of gentle wit, brings a degree of freshness to bear upon the plot". Shaikh Ayaz of Rediff rated the film 3.5/5 stars and wrote that Zoya Akhtar had put together a familiar plot but the film's fresh energy is entertaining. He wrote, "Akhtar's invigorating characters pump in fresh energy into a film that could have been strictly mediocre". Kaveree Bamzai of India Today also praised for Akhtar's direction and said, "By the time I finished watching Zindagi Na Milegi Dobara I was convinced that no one can make a romance as beautifully as a woman", giving the film 4 stars.

Subhash K Jha rated Zindagi Na Milegi Dobara 3.5/5 and wrote; "Zoya, God bless her aesthetics, sucks us into the beauty of the moment, not giving us any reason to believe that life's most precious truths are swathed in squalor". Blessy Chettiar of DNA India praised the music and Farhan Akhtar's acting as highlights of the film, saying, "For all this, the storywriters use heavy doses of symbolism. Deep-sea diving at Costa Brava, sky-diving in Sevilla and the San Fermin bull run in Pamplona, not to forget the Tomatina festival in Bunyol, where Arjun finally lets go. Fears are drowned, let open in the sky and finally at the mercy of raging bulls", giving it 3 stars. Rajeev Masand of CNN-IBN stated, "Zindagi Na Milegi Dobara takes the light-hearted tone of a fun, all-boys road trip through Spain to give you a deep and heartfelt message on why we should live life by seizing the moment and following our hearts". He also praised the performances, highlighting them as one of the main positives of the film, but also said the film's length "sucks some fun of out of the ride" and gave a rating of 3.5 stars. Raja Sen of Rediff said the film "tried too hard to be cool" and gave it 1.5/5 stars. Sudhish Kamath of The Hindu said "Zoya Akhtar's second outing as a director is way more filmi than her first about the film industry. This one only pretends to be real. It's not."

Ryan Gilbey of The Guardian was broadly positive about the film; he wrote, "It's still playing to full houses, and you can see why. Slick it may be. But tourist board employees representing the various Spanish cities flattered in the movie are not the only ones who will come out grinning", and that he found the film "stubbornly un-macho" for a buddy film. The National reviewer Kaleem Aftab, in his 4-star review wrote; "Throwing together road trip, romcom and buddy-buddy action in a single picture may sound like an ill-conceived masala mash-up, but like any good dish, the ingredients are blended together with affection to create one of the best feel-good movies of the year".

Box office 
In India, Zindagi Na Milegi Dobara came in second on release behind Harry Potter and the Deathly Hallows – Part 2. It opened well in the multiplexes; the occupancy ranged from 70 to 100 per cent, despite receiving an average opening in single-screen cinemas except in the metro cities. After ten days of worldwide showings it grossed . With no significant competition other than Singham, Zindagi Na Milegi Dobara remained in second place at the box office for four weeks after its release. It was one of the highest-grossing Bollywood films of 2011 in India and internationally; it was declared a blockbuster in India and in overseas territories.

Outside India, Zindagi Na Milegi Dobara grossed  in three days, which made it the biggest opening for an Indian film in 2011. The film reached top-twenty lists in the US and UK. It grossed £896,289 in UK, US$3,103,656 in the US, AU$387,384 in Australia and NZ$136,380 in New Zealand. As of January 2012, the film has grossed $7.25 million overseas.

The film grossed  worldwide, surpassing the worldwide gross of Roshan's Dhoom 2 (2006) and becoming the ninth-highest worldwide grossing Bollywood film of all time as of October 2011. As of October 2021, the film is ranked at No. 89 for worldwide grossing of Indian films.

Controversies 
After the release of Zindagi Na Milegi Dobara, animal rights organisation People for the Ethical Treatment of Animals (PETA) objected to the bull-running scene and sought support from fans via their Twitter page to ban the film. PETA spokesperson Poorva Joshipura spoke about the event and said, "We will now be contacting the Ministry of Information and Broadcasting and Central Board of Film Certification to take action". The film's producer Ritesh Sidhwani said, "We had submitted all the papers to the Animal Welfare Board India that stated that none of the animals were injured or hurt in any way and only then, the censor board cleared the movie. We are only showing the culture of Spain." Spanish-American artist Charo sent a letter to Zoya Akhtar on behalf of PETA asking her to remove all of the scenes related to the running of the bulls.

Accolades 

Zindagi Na Milegi Dobara won 2 awards at the 59th National Film Awards in the Best Audiography and Best Choreography categories. It won several other awards—mainly for Best Film and Best Director—at the Filmfare Awards, Stardust Awards, Zee Cine Awards, IIFA Awards, Screen Awards, and the Asian Film Awards.

Potential sequel 
Following the film's release, Zoya Akhtar said she had an idea of making a sequel to Zindagi Na Milegi Dobara; she said, "You never know, I might or may not make a sequel. It all depends on the right content." It has been reported that the actors are expected to reprise their roles in the sequel if it is officially launched. In an interview with Hindustan Times, Roshan said the plot of the sequel could be set five or six years after the events depicted in Zindagi Na Milegi Dobara and that the characters would be older and would have a reason to go on another trip. In August 2011, Zoya Akhtar said there were no plans for a sequel, despite requests from many viewers. After the IIFA ceremony, Farhan Akhtar said there was no necessity for a sequel. Later in 2013, in an interview with Hindustan Times, Zoya expressed interest in writing for the sequel after completing the filming of her next project, Dil Dhadakne Do (2015), which was released in June 2015, although in February 2019 she said, "Honestly, people want a second movie of ZNMD, but I think the best franchise would either be Luck By Chance or Dil Dhadakne Do."

References

External links 
 
 

2011 films
2011 comedy-drama films
2010s buddy comedy-drama films
2010s coming-of-age comedy-drama films
2010s Hindi-language films
2010s road comedy-drama films
Films about travel
Films about vacationing
Films directed by Zoya Akhtar
Films featuring a Best Choreography National Film Award-winning choreography
Films set in Mumbai
Films set in Spain
Films shot in Egypt
Films shot in England
Films that won the Best Audiography National Film Award
Indian buddy comedy-drama films
Indian coming-of-age comedy-drama films
Indian road comedy-drama films
Indian drama road movies